Kim Baldwin is an American writer. Combined, her novels have won an IPPY Award, Lambda Literary Award, and multiple Golden Crown Literary Awards. She also received The Alice B. Medal, which honors lifetime achievement for lesbian writers.

Personal life 
Baldwin lives in a cabin in a national forest in northern Michigan with two cats.

She enjoys photography and traveling. She first traveled to Europe when she was 14, then returned at 18 with Suitcase Theater. Since then, she has traveled globally.

Career 
For 20 years, Baldwin worked as a writer for CNN and eventually became editorial director.

Awards and honors

Publications

Alaska series 

 Whitewater Rendezvous (2006)
 Breaking the Ice (2009)
 High Impact (2011)

Elite Operatives series 

 Lethal Affairs (2008)
 Thief of Always (2009)
 Missing Lynx (2010)
 Dying to Live (2011)
 Demons are Forever, with Xenia Alexiou (2012)
 The Gemini Deception, with Xenia Alexiou (2013)
 One Last Thing (2015)

Short stories 

 "Overdue," in Erotic Interludes 2: Stolen Moments (2005)
 "The French Lesson,” in Erotic Interludes 2: Lessons Learned (2006)
 “Making Her Mine,” in Erotic Interludes 4: Extreme Passions
 “Off the Menu,” in Erotic Interludes 5: Road Games (2007)
 “Paradise Found," in Romantic Interludes 1: Discovery (2008)
 “Meeting my Match," in Romantic Interludes 2: Secrets (2009)
 Sleigh Ride: A short holiday fairy tale (2016)
 The French Lesson (2019)

Standalone novels 

 Force of Nature (2005)
 Hunter's Pursuit (2005)
 Flight Risk (2007)
 Focus of Desire (2007)
 Taken by Storm (2014)

References

External links 

 Official website

Living people
Lambda Literary Award winners
American lesbian writers
Writers from Michigan
American LGBT writers
Year of birth unknown
Year of birth missing (living people)